Pinnularia is a genus fresh water algae more specifically a type of diatom.

Habitat
Pinnularia is a predominantly fresh-water algae, usually found in ponds and moist soil.
They can also be found in springs, estuaries, sediments, and oceans.

External structure

Pinnularia are elongated elliptical unicellular organisms. Their cell walls are composed chiefly of pectic substances on a rigid silica framework. Their walls are composed of two halves called thecae (or less formally, valves.) These halves overlap like a Petri dish and its cover. The margins of the two thecae are covered by a connecting band called a cingulum and all together are referred to as a frustule. the surface view is called valve view and band view is called girdle view.
The outer larger valve is called Epitheca and the smaller inner valve is called hypotheca. The cell is covered by a mucilaginous layer.

Internal structure
The cytoplasm is arranged approximately in layers conforming to the shape of the cell's walls. A large central vacuole is present with the nucleus suspended in its centre by a transverse cytoplasmic bridge. Two chloroplasts are present along the sides of the cells, and contain chlorophyll a, c, beta-carotene and fucoxanthin pigments. One or two pyrenoids are usually present in each chloroplast, although like many heterokont algae Pinnularia tend to store their energy as fat. The cytoplasm also contains chrysolaminarin and some volutin.

Reproduction

Pinnularia like most diatoms, can reproduce by simple cell division. Nuclear division occurs by mitosis and cell divides into two parts. Each daughter receives one of the parent cell's thecae, which becomes that cell's epitheca. The cell then synthesizes a new hypotheca. Thus one daughter is the same size as the parent, and one is slightly smaller. With subsequent generations the average cell size of a Pinnularia population gradually becomes smaller. When a minimum average size is reached auxospore formation occurs and sexual reproduction restores the population's average cell size.

References

External links
Pinnularia major (Kützing)

Diatom genera
Naviculales
Taxa named by Christian Gottfried Ehrenberg